The 1924 Texas Mines Miners football team, sometimes known as the "Muckers", was an American football team that represented Texas School of Mines (now known as the University of Texas at El Paso) as an independent during the 1924 college football season. In its first season under head coach George B. Powell, the team compiled a 3–2–1 record and outscored opponents by a total of 70 to 51. The team lost its rivalry game with New Mexico A&M by a 19–0 score.

Schedule

References

Texas Mines
UTEP Miners football seasons
Texas Mines Miners football